Sorkh Kuh (also Romanized as Sorkh Kūh; also known as Sohrkote) is a village in Kangan Rural District, in the Central District of Jask County, Hormozgan Province, Iran. At the 2006 census, its population was 75, in 14 families.

References 

Populated places in Jask County